Kenneth, Ken or Kenny Campbell may refer to:

Actors
Ken Campbell (1941–2008), English writer, actor, director and comedian
J. Kenneth Campbell (born 1947), American film, stage, and television actor
Ken Hudson Campbell (born 1962), American actor

Sportsmen
Kenny Campbell (1892–1971), Scottish football goalkeeper
Ken Campbell (basketball) (1926–1999), American forward
Ken Campbell (American football) (born 1938), end for Titans of New York
Ken Campbell (swimmer) (born 1949), Canadian 1968 Olympian
Kenneth Campbell (boxer) (born 1949), Jamaican Olympic bantamweight

Others
Kenneth Campbell (politician) (1881–1951), Canadian legislator from British Columbia
Kenneth Campbell (VC) (1917–1941), Scottish airman in Second World War
Ken Campbell (palaeontologist) (1927–2017), Australian geologist and academic
Ken Campbell (evangelist) (1934–2006), Canadian fundamentalist Baptist and politician